First Presbyterian Church and Manse is a historic Presbyterian church located at West Madison Street and Park Avenue in the Mount Vernon-Belvedere neighborhood of Baltimore, Maryland, United States. The church is a rectangular brick building with a central tower flanked by protruding octagonal turrets at each corner. At the north end of the church is a two-story building appearing to be a transept and sharing a common roof with the church, but is separated from the auditorium by a bearing wall. The manse is a three-story stone-faced building. The church was begun about 1854 by Nathan G. Starkweather and finished by his assistant Edmund G. Lind around 1873. It is a notable example of Gothic Revival architecture and a landmark in the City of Baltimore.

Wendel Bollman fabricated much of the ironwork at his Patapsco Bridge and Ironworks and is famous for several iron truss bridges throughout the region especially on the Baltimore and Ohio Railroad. The manse, or rectory, is located to the left, or west of the entrance. Stonework is a red freestone or sandstone from New Brunswick.

First Presbyterian Church and Manse was listed on the National Register of Historic Places in 1973. It is now known as the First and Franklin Presbyterian Church, after merging in 1973 with the former Franklin Street Presbyterian Church several blocks to the south at the northwest corner of West Franklin and Cathedral Streets, across from the central Enoch Pratt Free Library and the Old Baltimore Cathedral (now the Basilica of the National Shrine of the Assumption of the Blessed Virgin Mary which was used by the merged congregation for a time and then sold to a fundamentalist Protestant congregation. Franklin Street Church was built in 1847 and designed in English Tudor Revival style by Robert Cary Long, Jr. and Col. Robert Snowden Andrews, C.S.A. (who also designed the earliest Eastern High School on Aisquith and Orleans Streets).

First Presbyterian Church is the oldest Presbyterian congregation in Baltimore, founded in 1761, then located after 1763 at East Fayette and North Streets (later Guilford Avenue) on the northwest corner in downtown which was the site for three its succeeding buildings until 1859, when the site was purchased by the Federal Government and constructed a U.S. Courthouse there, dedicated by President James Buchanan in 1860, later replaced by another courthouse on the entire block in 1889 and finally the current one in 1932, which is now "Courthouse East" for the Circuit Court of Maryland for Baltimore City.  It was instrumental in the establishment of the local Presbytery of Baltimore and many "daughter congregations" such as Second Presbyterian Church and others. The church and manse were listed on the National Register of Historic Places on June 18, 1973. They are included in the Baltimore National Heritage Area.

See also
 Franklin Street Presbyterian Church and Parsonage, the reunited sister congregation, also listed on the National Register of Historic Places, no longer occupied by a Presbyterian congregation

References

External links

, including undated photo, at Maryland Historical Trust
The First and Franklin Presbyterian Church website

Presbyterian Historical Society - Philadelphia, Pennsylvania website -  archives of the Presbyterian Church (U.S.A.) denomination

Presbyterian churches in Maryland
Presbyterian churches in Baltimore
Properties of religious function on the National Register of Historic Places in Baltimore
Gothic Revival church buildings in Maryland
Churches completed in 1854
19th-century Presbyterian church buildings in the United States
Baltimore National Heritage Area
Historic American Buildings Survey in Baltimore
Mount Vernon, Baltimore
Churches on the National Register of Historic Places in Maryland
1854 establishments in Maryland